An election for Speaker of the United States House of Representatives is held when the House first convenes after a general election for its two-year term, or when a sitting speaker dies, resigns, or is removed from the position. The speaker is the political and parliamentary leader of the House, and is simultaneously the body's presiding officer, the de facto leader of the body's majority party, and the institution's administrative head.

There have been 128 elections for speaker since the office was created in 1789. Traditionally, each party's caucus or conference selects a candidate for speaker from among its senior leaders prior to the vote. Prior to 1839, the House elected its speaker by paper ballot, but since, on all but three occasions, has done so by roll call vote. A majority of votes cast (as opposed to a majority of the full membership of the House) is necessary to elect a speaker. By House precedents, votes of present are not to be included in the official vote total, only votes cast for a person by name are; even so, they have been counted on several occasions.

If no candidate receives a majority vote, then the roll call is repeated until a speaker is elected. Multiple rounds of voting have been necessary 15 times since 1789, most recently in 2023. In the longest speaker election in House history, 133 ballots (cast over a two-month period) were needed before representatives chose Nathaniel Banks as their presiding officer for the 34th Congress (1855–1857).

Representatives are not restricted to voting for the candidate nominated by their party, but generally do. Additionally, as the U.S. Constitution does not explicitly state that the speaker must be an incumbent member of the House, it is permissible for representatives to vote for someone who is not a member of the House at the time, and non-members have received a few votes in various speaker elections over the past several years. Nevertheless, every person elected speaker has been a member.

Altogether, 55 people have served as speaker over the past  years; 32 of them served multiple terms and seven of those served nonconsecutive terms. Sam Rayburn holds the record for electoral victories, with 10. He led the House from September 1940 to January 1947, January 1949 to January 1953, and January 1955 to November 1961 (a tenure totaling 17 years). In the most recent election for speaker, held January 3–7, 2023, at the beginning of the 118th Congress, members elected Kevin McCarthy to office.

 1 Elections from 1789 to 1799
 1789
 1791
 1793
 1795
 1797
 1799
 2 Elections from 1801 to 1899
 1801
 1803
 1805
 1807
 1809
 1811
 1813
 1814
 1815
 1817
 1819
 1820
 1821
 1823
 1825
 1827
 1829
 1831
 1833
 1834
 1835
 1837
 1839
 1841
 1843
 1845
 1847
 1849
 1851
 1853
 1855–56
 1857
 1859–60
 1861
 1863
 1865
 1867
 1869 (40th Congress)
 1869 (41st Congress)
 1871
 1873
 1875
 1876
 1877
 1879
 1881
 1883
 1885
 1887
 1889
 1891
 1893
 1895
 1897
 1899
 3 Elections from 1901 to 1999
 1901
 1903
 1905
 1907
 1909
 1911
 1913
 1915
 1917
 1919
 1921
 1923
 1925
 1927
 1929
 1931
 1933
 1935
 1936
 1937
 1939
 1940
 1941
 1943
 1945
 1947
 1949
 1951
 1953
 1955
 1957
 1959
 1961
 1962
 1963
 1965
 1967
 1969
 1971
 1973
 1975
 1977
 1979
 1981
 1983
 1985
 1987
 January 1989
 June 1989
 1991
 1993
 1995
 1997
 1999
 4 Elections since 2001
 2001
 2003
 2005
 2007
 2009
 2011
 2013
 January 2015
 October 2015
 2017
 2019
 2021
 2023
 5 Notes
 6 References
 Citations
 Sources

Elections from 1789 to 1799

April 1789 
The first-ever election for speaker of the House took place on April 1, 1789, at the start of the 1st Congress, following the 1788–89 elections in which candidates who supported the new Frame of Government won a majority of the seats. Frederick Muhlenberg, who had promoted the ratification of the Constitution, received a majority of the votes cast and was elected speaker. Though political parties did not yet exist, political factions, from which they evolved, formed almost immediately after Congress began its work. Those who supported the Washington administration were referred to as "Pro-Administration", while those in opposition were known as "Anti-Administration".

October 1791 
An election for speaker took place October 24, 1791, at the start of the 2nd Congress, following the 1790–91 elections in which Pro-Administration candidates won a majority of the seats. Jonathan Trumbull Jr. received a majority of the votes cast and was elected speaker.

December 1793 
An election for speaker took place December 2, 1793, at the start of the 3rd Congress, following the 1792–93 elections in which anti-administration candidates won a majority of the seats. Former speaker Frederick Muhlenberg received a majority of the votes cast in the 3rd ballot and was elected speaker. This was the first speaker of the House election to be contested primarily on a partisan basis.

December 1795 
An election for speaker took place December 7, 1795, at the start of the 4th Congress, following the 1794–95 elections. During the preceding Congress, the Pro-Administration faction coalesced into the Federalist Party, and the Anti-Administration faction into the Democratic-Republican Party. Though Democratic-Republicans won a majority of the seats in these elections, several joined with the Federalists to elect Jonathan Dayton speaker on the first ballot.

May 1797 
An election for speaker took place May 15, 1797, at the start of the 5th Congress, following the 1796–97 elections in which Federalists won a majority of the seats. In a near-unanimous vote, Jonathan Dayton was re-elected speaker.

December 1799
An election for speaker took place December 2, 1799, at the start of the 6th Congress, following the 1798–99 elections in which Federalists won a majority of the seats. Theodore Sedgwick received a majority of the votes cast in the 2nd ballot and was elected speaker.

Elections from 1801 to 1899

December 1801 
An election for speaker took place on December 7, 1801, at the start of the 7th Congress, following the 1800–01 elections in which Democratic-Republicans won a majority of the seats. Nathaniel Macon received a majority of the votes cast and was elected speaker.

October 1803 
An election for speaker took place on October 17, 1803, at the start of the 8th Congress, following the 1802–03 elections in which Democratic-Republicans won a majority of the seats. Nathaniel Macon received a majority of the votes cast and was re-elected speaker.

December 1805 
An election for speaker took place December 2, 1805, at the start of the 9th Congress, following the 1804–05 elections in which the Democratic-Republicans won a majority of the seats. Nathaniel Macon received a majority of the votes cast in the 3rd ballot and was re-elected speaker. A number of Democratic-Republicans did not support Macon's bid for a third term as he had broken ranks with President Jefferson and aligned himself with the splinter Quids faction.

October 1807 
An election for speaker took place on October 26, 1807, at the start of the 10th Congress, following the 1806–07 elections in which Democratic-Republicans won a majority of the seats. Joseph B. Varnum received a majority of the votes cast and was elected speaker.

May 1809 
An election for speaker took place May 22, 1809, at the start of the 11th Congress, following the 1808–09 elections in which the Democratic-Republicans won a majority of the seats. On the first ballot, Joseph Varnum received 60 of the 118 votes cast for individuals. In addition to these, two ballots were returned blank. The question arose over whether or not the blank ballots counted. If they were, then the total number of votes cast would be 120, making the threshold for election 61. If they were not, then the threshold would be 60 (of 118), thus making Varnum the winner. After a brief debate a motion to proceed with a second ballot was approved. Varnum received a majority of the votes cast in the 2nd ballot and was re-elected speaker.

November 1811 
An election for speaker took place on November 4, 1811, at the start of the 12th Congress, following the 1810–11 elections in which Democratic-Republicans won a majority of the seats. Henry Clay, a freshman congressman, received a majority of the votes cast and was elected speaker.

May 1813 
An election for speaker took place on May 24, 1813, at the start of the 13th Congress, following the 1812–13 elections in which Democratic-Republicans won a majority of the seats. Henry Clay received a majority of the votes cast and was re-elected speaker.

January 1814 
On January 19, 1814, during the third session of the 13th Congress, Henry Clay resigned as speaker to accept a commission from President James Madison to serve as a negotiator for a peace agreement to end the War of 1812. Later that day, an intra-term election for a new speaker was held. Langdon Cheves received a majority of the votes cast and was elected speaker.

December 1815 
An election for speaker took place on December 4, 1815, at the start of the 14th Congress following the 1814–15 elections in which Democratic-Republicans won a majority of the seats. Elected again to the House, former speaker Henry Clay received a majority of the votes cast and was elected speaker.

December 1817 
An election for speaker took place on December 1, 1817, at the start of the  15th Congress following the 1816–17 elections in which Democratic-Republicans won a majority of the seats. In a near-unanimous vote, Henry Clay was re-elected speaker.

December 1819 
An election for speaker took place on December 6, 1819, at the start of the  16th Congress following the 1818–19 elections in which Democratic-Republicans won a majority of the seats. In a near-unanimous vote, Henry Clay was re-elected speaker.

November 1820 
In October 1820, between the first and the second session of the 16th Congress, Henry Clay resigned as speaker so he could return to his private law practice; he kept his House seat however, until his term ended the following March (he had not run for re-election in 1820). Consequently, an intra-term election for a new speaker was held on November 13–15, 1820. Coming as it did less than a year after the rancorous Missouri statehood debate, the choice of Clay's successor became mired in the continuing national debate between Northerners and Southerners over the expansion of slavery into territories and future states. The chief candidate of Northern antislavery members, John W. Taylor of New York, finally received a majority of the votes cast in the 22nd ballot and was elected speaker. In addition to discord over slavery, Taylor's path to victory was made even more difficult by a division within that state's congressional delegation between supporters of Governor DeWitt Clinton and those who opposed him (known as the Bucktails).

December 1821 
An election for speaker took place December 3–4, 1821, at the start of the 17th Congress, following the 1820–21 elections in which the Democratic-Republicans won a majority of the seats. Philip P. Barbour received a majority of the votes cast in the 12th ballot and was elected speaker.

December 1823 
An election for speaker took place on December 1, 1823, at the start of the 18th Congress following the 1822–23 elections in which Democratic-Republicans won a majority of the seats. Elected again to the House, former speaker Henry Clay received a majority of the votes cast and was elected speaker.

December 1825 
An election for speaker took place December 5, 1825, at the start of the 19th Congress, following the 1824–25 elections and the 1825 presidential contingent election. In the aftermath of these elections, the Democratic-Republican Party rapidly splintered between those who supported the new president, John Quincy Adams, and those who supported Andrew Jackson. Representatives who supported Adams held a slim majority in the House. Former speaker John W. Taylor received a majority of the votes cast in the 2nd ballot and was elected speaker.

December 1827 
An election for speaker took place on December 3, 1827, at the start of the 20th Congress following the 1826–27 elections in which Jacksonians, candidates supporting Andrew Jackson in opposition to President John Quincy Adams won a majority of the seats. Andrew Stevenson won a majority of the votes cast and was elected speaker.

December 1829 
An election for speaker took place on December 7, 1829, at the start of the 21st Congress following the 1828–29 elections in which Jacksonians, candidates supporting now-President Andrew Jackson won a majority of the seats. Andrew Stevenson won a majority of the votes cast and was re-elected speaker.

December 1831 
An election for speaker took place on December 5, 1831, at the start of the 22nd Congress following the 1830–31 elections in which Jacksonians won a majority of the seats. Andrew Stevenson won a majority of the votes cast and was re-elected speaker.

December 1833 
An election for speaker took place on December 2, 1833, at the start of the 23rd Congress following the 1832–33 elections in which Jacksonians won a majority of the seats. Andrew Stevenson won a majority of the votes cast and was re-elected speaker.

June 1834 
In June 1834, Andrew Stevenson resigned as speaker of the House and from Congress to accept President Andrew Jackson's nomination as the U.S. minister to the United Kingdom. Consequently, an intra-term election for a new speaker was held on June 2, 1834, during the 23rd Congress. The president favored James K. Polk for the post, but when members of his "Kitchen Cabinet" went to Capitol Hill and lobbied on Polk's behalf, they were rebuffed. Perceived as an encroachment upon a constitutional prerogative of the House, the effort to influence the vote splintered Jacksonian party unity and energized the opposition. John Bell ultimately received a majority of the votes cast in the 10th ballot and was elected speaker.

December 1835 
An election for speaker took place on December 7, 1835, at the start of the 24th Congress, following the 1834–35 elections in which Jacksonians won a majority of the seats. James K. Polk won a majority of the votes cast and was elected speaker.

September 1837 
An election for speaker took place on September 4, 1837, at the start of the 25th Congress, following the 1836–37 elections in which Democrats won a majority of the seats. James K. Polk won a majority of the votes cast and was re-elected speaker.

December 1839 
An election for speaker took place December 14–16, 1839, at the start of the 26th Congress, following the 1838–39 elections in which the Democrats won a slim majority of the seats. Balloting was delayed for two weeks as Democrats and Whigs contested the seating of five representatives-elect from New Jersey, commencing only after the House resolved not to seat either delegation immediately. Once underway, the narrowly divided House was unable to make a quick choice. Finally, on the 11th ballot, Robert M. T. Hunter received a majority of the votes cast and was elected speaker.

May 1841 
An election for speaker took place on May 31, 1841, at the start of the 27th Congress, following the 1840–41 elections in which Whigs won a majority of the seats. John White won a majority of the votes cast and was elected speaker.

December 1843 
An election for speaker took place December 4, 1843, at the start of the 28th United States Congress following the 1842–43 elections in which Democrats won a majority of the seats. John W. Jones received a majority of the votes cast and was elected speaker.

December 1845 
An election for speaker took place December 1, 1845, at the start of the 29th United States Congress following the 1844–45 elections in which Democrats won a majority of the seats. John W. Davis received a majority of the votes cast and was elected speaker.

December 1847 
An election for speaker took place December 6, 1847, at the start of the 30th Congress, following the 1846–47 elections in which the Whigs won a slim majority of the seats. Robert C. Winthrop received a majority of the votes cast in the 3rd ballot and was elected speaker. The election became a multi-ballot affair when a few "Conscience Whigs" initially refused to support Winthrop because he rejected their demand for a pledge to constitute key House committees so as to favor the reporting of antislavery legislation.

December 1849 
An election for speaker took place December 3–22, 1849, at the start of the 31st Congress, following the 1848–49 elections in which the Democrats won a slim majority of the seats. Divisions within both the Democratic Party and Whig Party over slavery plus the presence of the new Single-issue antislavery Free Soil Party led to pandemonium in the House and a protracted struggle to elect a speaker. After 59 ballots without a majority choice, the House adopted a plurality rule stating that, if after three more ballots no one garnered a majority of the votes, the person receiving the highest number of votes on the next ensuing ballot would be declared to have been chosen speaker. On the decisive 63rd ballot, Howell Cobb received the most votes, 102 votes out of 221, or nine less than a majority, and was elected speaker. Altogether, 94 individual congressmen received votes in this election.

December 1851 
An election for speaker took place December 1, 1851, at the start of the 32nd Congress following the 1850–51 elections in which Democrats won a majority of the seats. Linn Boyd received a majority of the votes cast and was elected speaker.

December 1853 
An election for speaker took place December 5, 1853, at the start of the 33rd Congress following the 1852–53 elections in which Democrats won a majority of the seats. Linn Boyd received a majority of the votes cast and was re-elected speaker.

December 1855 – February 1856 
An election for speaker took place over the course of two months, December 3, 1855, through February 2, 1856, at the start of the 34th Congress, following the 1854–55 elections in which candidates primarily in Northern states running on various fusion tickets—included members from the Whig, Free Soil and American parties, along with members of the nascent Republican Party—grouped together under the Opposition Party label, won a majority of the seats. This new, but transitional, party sprang-up amid the fallout from the Kansas–Nebraska Act (approved by Congress in mid 1854), which had sparked violence over slavery in Kansas and hardened sectional positions on the subject. Personal views on slavery drove members' words and actions during this protracted electoral contest. After 129 ballots without a majority choice, the House once again adopted a plurality rule to break the deadlock. On the decisive 133rd ballot, Nathaniel P. Banks received the most votes, 103 votes out of 214, or five less than a majority, and was elected speaker. A record 135 individual congressmen received votes in this, the longest speaker election in House history.

December 1857 
An election for speaker took place on December 7, 1857, at the start of the 35th Congress, following the 1856–57 elections in which Democrats won a majority of the seats. James L. Orr received a majority of the votes cast and was elected speaker.

December 1859 – February 1860 
An election for speaker took place over the course of eight weeks, December 5, 1859, through February 1, 1860, at the start of the 36th Congress, following the 1858–59 elections in which the Republicans won a plurality of the seats. William Pennington, a freshman congressman, received a majority of the votes cast in the 44th ballot and was elected speaker. In total, 90 representatives received at least one vote during the election. The bitter election dispute deepened the rift between slave states and free states and helped push Southern political leaders further toward secession.

July 1861 
An election for speaker took place July 4, 1861, at the start of the 37th Congress, following the 1860–61 elections in which Republicans won a majority of the seats, and the subsequent secession of several states from the Union at the outset of the Civil War. Galusha A. Grow received a majority of the votes cast on the first ballot and was elected speaker, but only after his chief opponent, Francis Preston Blair Jr., withdrew following the roll call vote, at which time 28 votes shifted to Grow.

December 1863 
An election for speaker took place on December 7, 1863, at the start of the 38th Congress, following the 1862–63 elections in which Republicans won only a plurality of the seats, but retained control of the House with the assistance of Unconditional Unionist members. Schuyler Colfax received a majority of the votes cast and was elected speaker.

December 1865 
An election for speaker took place on December 4, 1865, at the start of the 39th Congress, following the 1864–65 elections in which Republicans won a majority of the seats. Schuyler Colfax received a majority of the votes cast and was re-elected speaker.

March 1867 
An election for speaker took place on March 4, 1867, at the start of the 40th Congress, following the 1866–67 elections in which Republicans won a majority of the seats. Schuyler Colfax received a majority of the votes cast and was re-elected speaker.

March 1869 (40th Congress) 
On March 3, 1869, the final full day of the 40th Congress, Schuyler Colfax, who was to be sworn into office as the nation's 17th vice president the next day, resigned as speaker. Immediately afterward, the House passed a motion declaring Theodore Pomeroy duly elected speaker in place of Colfax (for one day).

March 1869 (41st Congress) 
An election for speaker took place on March 4, 1869, at the start of the 41st Congress, following the 1868–69 elections in which Republicans won a majority of the seats. James G. Blaine received a majority of the votes cast and was elected speaker.

March 1871 
An election for speaker took place on March 4, 1871, at the start of the 42nd Congress, following the 1870–71 elections in which Republicans won a majority of the seats. James G. Blaine received a majority of the votes cast and was re-elected speaker.

December 1873 
An election for speaker took place on December 1, 1873, at the start of the 43rd Congress, following the 1872–73 elections in which Republicans won a majority of the seats. James G. Blaine received a majority of the votes cast and was re-elected speaker.

December 1875 
An election for speaker took place on December 6, 1875, at the start of the 44th Congress, following the 1874–75 elections in which Democrats won a majority of the seats. Michael C. Kerr, who had just returned to Congress after losing re-election two years earlier, received a majority of the votes cast and was elected speaker. This was the first time in 16 years, since 1859, that Democrats controlled the House.

December 1876 
Michael C. Kerr died on August 19, 1876, between the first and second sessions of the 44th Congress. Consequently, an intra-term election for a new speaker was held on December 4, 1876, when Congress reconvened. Samuel J. Randall received a majority of the votes cast and was elected speaker.

October 1877 
An election for speaker took place on October 15, 1877, at the start of the 45th Congress, following the 1876–77 elections in which Democrats won a majority of the seats, and the electoral crisis spawned by the contentious 1876 presidential election. Samuel J. Randall received a majority of the votes cast and was re-elected speaker.

March 1879 
An election for speaker took place on March 18, 1879, at the start of the 46th Congress, following the 1878–79 elections in which Democrats won only a plurality of the seats, but retained control of power with the help of several Independent Democrats. Samuel J. Randall received a slim majority of the votes cast and was re-elected speaker.

December 1881 
An election for speaker took place on December 5, 1881, at the start of the 47th Congress following the 1880 elections in which Republicans won a majority of the seats. J. Warren Keifer won a majority of the votes cast and was elected speaker.

December 1883 
An election for speaker took place on December 3, 1883, at the start of the 48th Congress following the 1882 elections in which Democrats won a majority of the seats. John G. Carlisle received a majority of the votes cast and was elected speaker.

December 1885 
An election for speaker took place on December 7, 1885, at the start of the 49th Congress following the 1884 elections in which Democrats won a majority of the seats. John G. Carlisle received a majority of the votes cast and was re-elected speaker.

December 1887 
An election for speaker took place on December 5, 1887, at the start of the 50th Congress following the 1886 elections in which Democrats won a majority of the seats. John G. Carlisle received a majority of the votes cast and was re-elected speaker.

December 1889 
An election for speaker took place on December 2, 1889, at the start of the 51st Congress following the 1888 elections in which Republicans won a majority of the seats. Thomas B. Reed received a majority of the votes cast and was elected speaker.

December 1891 
An election for speaker took place on December 8, 1891, at the start of the 52nd Congress following the 1890 elections in which Democrats won a majority of the seats.  Charles F. Crisp received a majority of the votes cast and was elected speaker.

August 1893 
An election for speaker took place on August 7, 1893, at the start of the 53rd Congress following the 1892 elections in which Democrats won a majority of the seats. Charles F. Crisp received a majority of the votes cast and was re-elected speaker.

December 1895 
An election for speaker took place on December 2, 1895, at the start of the 54th Congress following the 1894 elections in which Republicans won a majority of the seats. Former speaker Thomas B. Reed received a majority of the votes cast and was elected speaker.

March 1897 
An election for speaker took place on March 15, 1897, at the start of the 55th Congress following the 1896 elections in which Republicans won a majority of the seats. Thomas B. Reed received a majority of the votes cast and was re-elected speaker.

December 1899 
An election for speaker took place December 4, 1899, at the start of the 56th Congress following the 1898 elections in which Republicans won a majority of the seats. David B. Henderson received a majority of the votes cast and was elected speaker.

Elections from 1901 to 1999

December 1901 
An election for speaker took place December 2, 1901, at the start of the 57th Congress following the 1900 elections in which Republicans won a majority of the seats. David B. Henderson received a majority of the votes cast and was re-elected speaker.

November 1903 
An election for speaker took place November 9, 1903, at the start of the 58th Congress following the 1902 elections in which Republicans won a majority of the seats. Joseph Cannon received a majority of the votes cast and was elected speaker.

December 1905 
An election for speaker took place December 4, 1905, at the start of the 59th Congress following the 1904 elections in which Republicans won a majority of the seats. Joseph Cannon received a majority of the votes cast and was re-elected speaker.

December 1907 
An election for speaker took place December 2, 1907, at the start of the 60th Congress following the 1906 elections in which Republicans won a majority of the seats. Joseph Cannon received a majority of the votes cast and was re-elected speaker.

March 1909 
An election for speaker took place March 15, 1909, at the start of the 61st Congress following the 1908 elections in which Republicans won a majority of the seats. Joseph Cannon received a majority of the votes cast and was re-elected speaker. Cannon's election to a fourth term as speaker was challenged by a group of dissatisfied progressive Republicans, who voted for other people.

April 1911 
An election for speaker took place April 4, 1911, at the start of the 62nd Congress following the 1910 elections in which Democrats won a majority of the seats. Champ Clark received a majority of the votes cast and was elected speaker. This was the first time in 16 years, since 1895, that Democrats controlled the House.

April 1913 
An election for speaker took place April 7, 1913, at the start of the 63rd Congress following the 1912 elections in which Democrats won a majority of the seats. Champ Clark received a majority of the votes cast and was re-elected speaker.

December 1915 
An election for speaker took place December 6, 1915, at the start of the 64th Congress following the 1914 elections in which Democrats won a majority of the seats. Champ Clark received a majority of the votes cast and was re-elected speaker.

April 1917 
An election for speaker took place April 2, 1917, at the start of the 65th Congress following 1916 elections in which Republicans won a plurality of the seats. Even so, Champ Clark received a majority of the votes cast and was re-elected speaker. Democrats were able to retain control of the House by forming a Coalition with third-party (Progressive, Prohibition and Socialist) members.

May 1919 
An election for speaker took place May 19, 1919, at the start of the 66th Congress following 1918 elections in which Republicans won a majority of the seats. Frederick H. Gillett received a majority of the votes cast and was elected speaker.

April 1921 
An election for speaker took place April 11, 1921, at the start of the 67th Congress following 1920 elections in which Republicans won a majority of the seats. Frederick H. Gillett received a majority of the votes cast and was re-elected speaker.

December 1923 
An election for speaker took place December 3–5, 1923, at the start of the 68th Congress, following the 1922 elections in which the Republicans won a majority of the seats. Frederick H. Gillett received a majority of the votes cast in the 9th ballot and was re-elected speaker. Progressive Republicans had refused to support Gillett for the first eight ballots. Only after winning concessions from Republican conference leaders (a seat on the House Rules Committee and a pledge that requested House rules changes would be considered) did they agree to support him.

December 1925 
An election for speaker took place December 7, 1925, at the start of the 69th Congress following 1924 elections in which Republicans won a majority of the seats. Nicholas Longworth received a majority of the votes cast and was elected speaker, even though progressive Republicans refused to vote for him.

December 1927 
An election for speaker took place December 5, 1927, at the start of the 70th Congress following 1926 elections in which Republicans won a majority of the seats. Nicholas Longworth received a majority of the votes cast and was re-elected speaker.

April 1929 
An election for speaker took place April 15, 1929, at the start of the 71st Congress following 1928 elections in which Republicans won a majority of the seats. Nicholas Longworth received a majority of the votes cast and was re-elected speaker.

December 1931 
An election for speaker took place on December 7, 1931, at the start of the 72nd Congress, following the 1930 elections in which Republicans won a one-seat majority. However, during the 13 months between Election Day and the start of the new Congress, 14 members-elect died, including the incumbent speaker, Nicholas Longworth, who died on April 9, 1931. After the Republicans lost four of the special elections called to fill the vacancies, when Congress convened, the Democrats held a three-seat majority in the House. John N. Garner received a majority of the votes cast and was elected speaker.

March 1933 
An election for speaker took place March 9, 1933, at the start of the 73rd Congress, following the 1932 elections in which Democrats won a majority of the seats. Henry T. Rainey received a majority of the votes cast and was elected speaker.

January 1935 
An election for speaker took place on January 3, 1935, on the opening day of the 74th Congress, two months after the 1934 elections in which Democrats won a majority of the seats. Joseph Byrns received a majority of the votes cast and was elected speaker.

June 1936 
Speaker Joseph W. Byrns died suddenly in the early hours of June 4, 1936, during the 74th Congress. Consequently, when the House convened that day, a resolution declaring William B. Bankhead duly elected speaker was adopted by voice vote.

January 1937 
An election for speaker took place on January 5, 1937, on the opening day of the 75th Congress, two months after the 1936 elections in which Democrats won a majority of the seats. William B. Bankhead received a majority of the votes cast and was re-elected speaker.

January 1939 
An election for speaker took place on January 3, 1939, on the opening day of the 76th Congress, two months after the 1938 elections in which Democrats won a majority of the seats. William B. Bankhead received a majority of the votes cast and was re-elected speaker.

September 1940 
Speaker William B. Bankhead died on September 15, 1940, during the 76th Congress. Accordingly, when the House convened the next day, a resolution declaring Sam Rayburn duly elected speaker was adopted by voice vote.

January 1941 
An election for speaker took place on January 3, 1941, on the opening day of the 77th Congress, two months after the 1940 elections in which Democrats won a majority of the seats. Sam Rayburn received a majority of the votes cast and was re-elected speaker.

January 1943 
An election for speaker took place on January 6, 1943, on the opening day of the 78th Congress, two months after the 1942 elections in which Democrats won a majority of the seats. Sam Rayburn received a majority of the votes cast and was re-elected speaker.

January 1945 
An election for speaker took place on January 3, 1945, on the opening day of the 79th Congress, two months after the 1944 elections in which Democrats won a majority of the seats. Sam Rayburn received a majority of the votes cast and was re-elected speaker.

January 1947 
An election for speaker took place on January 3, 1947, on the opening day of the 80th Congress, two months after the 1946 elections in which Republicans won a majority of the seats. Joseph W. Martin Jr. received a majority of the votes cast and was elected speaker. This was the first time in 16 years, since 1931, that Republicans controlled the House.

January 1949 
An election for speaker took place on January 3, 1949, on the opening day of the 81st Congress, two months after the 1948 elections in which Democrats won a majority of the seats. Former speaker Sam Rayburn received a majority of the votes cast and was elected speaker.

January 1951 
An election for speaker took place on January 3, 1951, on the opening day of the 82nd Congress, two months after the 1950 elections in which Democrats won a majority of the seats. Sam Rayburn received a majority of the votes cast and was re-elected speaker.

January 1953 
An election for speaker took place on January 3, 1953, on the opening day of the 83rd Congress, two months after the 1952 elections in which Republicans won a majority of the seats. Former speaker Joseph W. Martin Jr. received a majority of the votes cast and was elected speaker.

January 1955 
An election for speaker took place on January 5, 1955, on the opening day of the 84th Congress, two months after the 1954 elections in which Democrats won a majority of the seats. Former speaker Sam Rayburn received a majority of the votes cast and was elected speaker, becoming the first member since Henry Clay in the 1820s to have a third stint as speaker.

January 1957 
An election for speaker took place on January 3, 1957, on the opening day of the 85th Congress, two months after the 1956 elections in which Democrats won a majority of the seats. Sam Rayburn received a majority of the votes cast and was re-elected speaker.

January 1959 
An election for speaker took place on January 7, 1959, on the opening day of the 86th Congress, two months after the 1958 elections in which Democrats won a majority of the seats. Sam Rayburn received a majority of the votes cast and was re-elected speaker.

January 1961 
An election for speaker took place on January 3, 1961, on the opening day of the 87th Congress, two months after the 1960 elections in which Democrats won a majority of the seats. Sam Rayburn received a majority of the votes cast and was re-elected speaker.

January 1962 
Sam Rayburn died on November 16, 1961, between the first and second sessions of 87th Congress. Consequently, an intra-term election for a new speaker was held on January 10, 1962, when Congress reconvened. John McCormack received a majority of the votes cast and was elected speaker.

January 1963 
An election for speaker took place on January 9, 1963, on the opening day of the 88th Congress, two months after the 1962 elections in which Democrats won a majority of the seats. John W. McCormack received a majority of the votes cast and was re-elected speaker.

January 1965 
An election for speaker took place on January 4, 1965, on the opening day of the 89th Congress, two months after the 1964 elections in which Democrats won a majority of the seats. John W. McCormack received a majority of the votes cast and was re-elected speaker.

January 1967 
An election for speaker took place on January 10, 1967, on the opening day of the 90th Congress, two months after the 1966 elections in which Democrats won a majority of the seats. John W. McCormack received a majority of the votes cast and was re-elected speaker.

January 1969 
An election for speaker took place on January 3, 1969, on the opening day of the 91st Congress, two months after the 1968 elections in which Democrats won a majority of the seats. John W. McCormack received a majority of the votes cast and was re-elected speaker.

January 1971 
An election for speaker took place on January 21, 1971, on the opening day of the 92nd Congress, two months after the 1970 elections in which Democrats won a majority of the seats. Carl Albert received a majority of the votes cast and was elected speaker.

January 1973 
An election for speaker took place on January 3, 1973, on the opening day of the 93rd Congress, two months after the 1972 elections in which Democrats won a majority of the seats. Carl Albert received a majority of the votes cast and was re-elected speaker.

January 1975 
An election for speaker took place on January 14, 1975, on the opening day of the 94th Congress, two months after the 1974 elections in which Democrats won a majority of the seats. Carl Albert received a majority of the votes cast and was re-elected speaker.

January 1977 
An election for speaker took place on January 4, 1977, on the opening day of the 95th Congress, two months after the 1976 elections in which Democrats won a majority of the seats. Tip O'Neill received a majority of the votes cast and was elected speaker.

January 1979 
An election for speaker took place on January 15, 1979, on the opening day of the 96th Congress, two months after the 1978 elections in which Democrats won a majority of the seats. Tip O'Neill received a majority of the votes cast and was re-elected speaker.

January 1981 
An election for speaker took place on January 5, 1981, on the opening day of the 97th Congress, two months after the 1980 elections in which Democrats won a majority of the seats. Tip O'Neill received a majority of the votes cast and was re-elected speaker.

January 1983 
An election for speaker took place on January 3, 1983, on the opening day of the 98th Congress, two months after the 1982 elections in which Democrats won a majority of the seats. Tip O'Neill received a majority of the votes cast and was re-elected speaker.

January 1985 
An election for speaker took place on January 3, 1985, on the opening day of the 99th Congress, two months after the 1984 elections in which Democrats won a majority of the seats. Tip O'Neill received a majority of the votes cast and was re-elected speaker.

January 1987 
An election for speaker took place on January 6, 1987, on the opening day of the 100th Congress, two months after the 1986 elections in which Democrats won a majority of the seats. Jim Wright received a majority of the votes cast and was elected speaker.

January 1989 
An election for speaker took place on January 3, 1989, on the opening day of the 101st Congress, two months after the 1988 elections in which Democrats won a majority of the seats. Jim Wright received a majority of the votes cast and was re-elected speaker.

June 1989 
In June 1989, Jim Wright resigned as speaker of the House and from Congress amid a House Ethics Committee investigation into his financial dealings. Consequently, an intra-term election for a new speaker was held on June 6, 1989, during the 101st Congress. Tom Foley received a majority of the votes cast and was elected speaker.

January 1991 
An election for speaker took place on January 3, 1991, on the opening day of the 102nd Congress, two months after the 1990 elections in which Democrats won a majority of the seats. Tom Foley received a majority of the votes cast and was re-elected speaker.

January 1993 
An election for speaker took place on January 5, 1993, on the opening day of the 103rd Congress, two months after the 1992 elections in which Democrats won a majority of the seats. Tom Foley received a majority of the votes cast and was re-elected speaker.

January 1995 
An election for speaker took place on January 4, 1995, on the opening day of the 104th Congress, two months after the 1994 elections in which Republicans won a majority of the seats. Newt Gingrich received a majority of the votes cast and was elected speaker. This was the first time in 40 years, since 1955, that Republicans controlled the House.

January 1997 
An election for speaker took place on January 7, 1997, on the opening day of the 105th Congress, two months after the 1996 elections in which Republicans won a majority of the seats. Newt Gingrich received a majority of the votes cast and was re-elected speaker. A number of Republicans did not support Gingrich's bid for a second term, and a few of them voted for other people. It was the first time in half a century in which votes were cast for someone besides the Democratic or Republican nominee.

January 1999 
An election for speaker took place on January 6, 1999, on the opening day of the 106th Congress, two months after the 1998 elections in which Republicans won a majority of the seats. Dennis Hastert received a majority of the votes cast and was elected speaker.

Elections since 2001

January 2001 
An election for speaker took place on January 3, 2001, on the opening day of the 107th Congress, two months after the 2000 elections in which Republicans won a majority of the seats. Dennis Hastert received a majority of the votes cast and was re-elected speaker.

January 2003 
An election for speaker took place on January 7, 2003, on the opening day of the 108th Congress, two months after the 2002 elections in which Republicans won a majority of the seats. Dennis Hastert received a majority of the votes cast and was re-elected speaker.

January 2005 
An election for speaker took place on January 4, 2005, on the opening day of the 109th Congress, two months after the 2004 elections in which Republicans won a majority of the seats. Dennis Hastert received a majority of the votes cast and was re-elected speaker.

January 2007 
An election for speaker took place on January 4, 2007, on the opening day of the 110th Congress, two months after the 2006 elections in which Democrats won a majority of the seats. Nancy Pelosi received a majority of the votes cast and was elected speaker, becoming the first woman speaker of the House in U.S. history. This was the first time in 12 years, since 1995, that the Democrats controlled the House.

January 2009 
An election for speaker took place on January 6, 2009, on the opening day of the 111th Congress, two months after the 2008 elections in which Democrats won a majority of the seats. Nancy Pelosi received a majority of the votes cast and was re-elected speaker.

January 2011 
An election for speaker took place on January 5, 2011, at the start of the 112th Congress, two months after the 2010 elections in which Republicans won a majority of the seats. John Boehner received a majority of the votes cast and was elected speaker of the House. Frustrated by widespread election losses, several "Blue Dog Democrats" refused to vote for outgoing speaker Nancy Pelosi.

January 2013 
An election for speaker took place on January 3, 2013, at the start of the 113th Congress, two months after the 2012 elections in which Republicans won a majority of the seats. John Boehner received a majority of the votes cast, despite the defections of several members from his own party, and was re-elected speaker.

January 2015 

An election for speaker took place on January 6, 2015, at the start of the 114th Congress, two months after the 2014 elections in which Republicans won a majority of the seats. John Boehner received a majority of the votes cast and was re-elected speaker, even though Freedom Caucus Republicans chose not to vote for him.

October 2015 

On September 25, 2015, John Boehner formally announced his intention to resign from the speakership and the House. Consequently, an intra-term election for a new speaker was held on October 29, 2015, during the 114th Congress. Paul Ryan received a majority of the votes cast and was elected speaker.

January 2017 
An election for speaker took place on January 3, 2017, on the opening day of the 115th Congress, two months after the 2016 elections in which Republicans won a majority of the seats. Paul Ryan received a majority of the votes cast and was re-elected speaker.

January 2019 

An election for speaker took place on January 3, 2019, on the opening day of the 116th Congress, two months after the 2018 elections in which Democrats won a majority of the seats. Former speaker Nancy Pelosi received a majority of the votes cast and was elected speaker, even though several Democrats did not vote for her. With this victory, she became the first person since Sam Rayburn in the 1950s to return to the speakership after losing it.

January 2021

An election for speaker took place on January 3, 2021, at the start of the 117th Congress, two months after the 2020 elections  in which Democrats won a slim majority of the seats. In a break with tradition due to the COVID-19 pandemic, all House members-elect did not gather together in the chamber to vote and record their presence, but rather, were summoned to the chambers in seven groups of about 72 persons. Nancy Pelosi received a majority of the votes cast and was re-elected speaker.

January 2023

An election for speaker was held January 3–7, 2023, at the start of the 118th Congress, two months after the 2022 elections in which Republicans gained the House with a thin majority. Kevin McCarthy received a majority of the votes cast in the 15th ballot and was elected speaker. Due to division within the House Republican Conference, no candidate received a majority of the votes on the first ballot, necessitating what became the longest multiple-ballot speaker election since before the Civil War. McCarthy's victory came when the remaining six anti-McCarthy holdouts voted "present" on the 15th ballot, thus reducing the threshold of votes needed for a majority to 215 members present and voting for a person by name.

Notes

References

Citations

Sources

 
 
 

 
Speaker US House